The 2006–07 Toto Cup Artzit was the 8th time the cup was being contested. The final was played at Haberfeld Stadium on 13 February 2007.

The winners, for the second year in a row, were Hapoel Ramat Gan, beating Sektzia Nes Tziona 1–0 in the final.

Group stage

Group A

Group B

Semifinals

Final

See also
 Toto Cup
 2006–07 Liga Artzit
 2006–07 in Israeli football

External links
 2006/2007 Artzit Toto Cup IFA 

Toto Cup Artzit
Toto Cup Artzit
Israel Toto Cup Artzit